Carloman may refer to:
 Carloman (fl. late 6th century), father of Pepin of Landen
 Carloman (mayor of the palace) (ruled 741–47)
 Carloman I, king of the Franks (768–71)
 Carloman, birth name of Pepin of Italy (781–810)
 Carloman, son of Charles the Bald (died 876)
 Carloman of Bavaria (ruled 876–80)
 Carloman II, king of the Franks (879–84)

See also
Carlmann Kolb
Claes-Göran Carlman
 Kaliman I of Bulgaria (ruled 1241–46) 
 Kaliman II of Bulgaria (ruled 1256–57)